Cavedon is a surname. Notable people with the surname include:

Andrew Cavedon (born 1971), Australian rules footballer
Giorgio Cavedon (1930–2001), Italian publisher, cartoonist, and screenwriter